Green Garden may refer to:

 "Green Garden" (song), by Laura Mvula
 Green Garden Township, Ellsworth County, Kansas, United States
 Green Garden Township, Will County, Illinois, United States
 Green Garden (Upperville, Virginia), United States, a historic house and farm
 Rashtriya Dalit Prerna Sthal and Green Garden, India